Darrell Lamont Whitmore (born November 18, 1968) is an American former professional baseball player for the Cleveland Indians and Florida Marlins of Major League Baseball (MLB) and was a college football and baseball player for the West Virginia Mountaineers.

Career

College career
Darrell Whitmore played football and baseball at West Virginia University. Whitemore started his football career in 1988 as a freshman free safety. He was a standout throughout the Mountaineers' undefeated season until he broke his leg in West Virginia's final regular season game against Syracuse University. His injury was one of the factors in West Virginia's loss to the University of Notre Dame in the 1989 Fiesta Bowl. Whitmore's freshman season ended with 61 tackles, two fumble recoveries, one forced fumble, and four interceptions. Whitmore also returned one of his interceptions 34 yards for a touchdown, his only career score.

As a sophomore, in 1989, Whitmore posted 68 tackles, a fumble recovery, and three interceptions. The next season, his junior year of 1990, Whitmore recorded 64 total tackles, a forced fumble, and four interceptions. In his final collegiate season, Whitmore posted a career-low 23 tackles and three interceptions.

Whitmore totaled 216 tackles and 14 interceptions in his four-year career as a free safety. As a baseball player, Whitmore became one of the greatest pure hitters in school history while playing right field.

Major League Baseball
Whitmore was drafted 46th overall, in the second round of the 1990 Major League Baseball Draft by the Cleveland Indians. Whitmore was signed June 13, 1990. The Florida Marlins selected Whitmore as the 16th pick in the November 1992 Major League Baseball expansion draft. He made his MLB debut with the Marlins on June 25, 1993. Whitmore played three years in the major leagues, from 1993 to 1995. He also played in the Nippon Professional Baseball (NPB) for the Chiba Lotte Marines in 1996.

Whitmore played 112 games in his Major League career, totaling 5 home runs and 67 hits and 21 RBIs.

References

External links

1968 births
Living people
African-American baseball players
African-American players of American football
American expatriate baseball players in Canada
American expatriate baseball players in Japan
American expatriate baseball players in Mexico
American football defensive backs
Baseball players from Virginia
Burlington Indians players (1986–2006)
Carolina Mudcats players
Charlotte Knights players
Chiba Lotte Marines players
Edmonton Trappers players
Florida Marlins players
Indianapolis Indians players
Kinston Indians players
Long Island Ducks players
Major League Baseball right fielders
Memphis Redbirds players
Mexican League baseball right fielders
Nashville Sounds players
Nippon Professional Baseball outfielders
Olmecas de Tabasco players
Players of American football from Virginia
People from Front Royal, Virginia
Syracuse SkyChiefs players
Watertown Indians players
West Virginia Mountaineers baseball players
West Virginia Mountaineers football players
21st-century African-American people
20th-century African-American sportspeople